"Sin Ti" (English: "Without You") is a song by Mexican singer Samo from his first studio album Inevitable. It was revealed that the song is the first single from the album released on May 27, 2013 on radio, and digitally on July 16, 2013.

Track listing
iTunes digital single

Music video
The video was filmed in his native Veracruz, on the beach Chachalacas, and was under the direction of Ricardo Calderón. The filming lasted two days and each day began before dawn to capture these images early. On June 6, 2013 the singer posted on his official Twitter "We continue the video recording #Sinti. In which place do you believe that it is being recorded? :)". The video was released on July 30, 2013 on his official VEVO account.

Charts and certifications

Weekly charts

Certifications

Year-end charts

Radio and release history

References

External links
 Sin Ti – Sony Music

2013 singles
Spanish-language songs
2013 songs
Sony Music Latin singles
Samo (singer) songs
Songs written by Andrés Castro
Songs written by Edgar Barrera
Song recordings produced by Edgar Barrera